Melody Hernandez (born 30 October 1990) is an Australian gymnastics competitor training at the Australian Institute of Sport. She is of the top gymnasts in Australia, her highlight when she made the Australian team for the 2006 World Artistic Gymnastics Championships in Aarhus, Denmark. In 2007, Melody placed 4th overall in the Australian Championships, after 3 top-ranked Australian gymnasts, one of which placed 5th overall at the 2006 world championships. After suffering a horrible injury on both her legs in 2005, Melody came back strongly and is currently still going strong, hoping to make the 2008 Beijing Olympics Team.

External links
Gymnastics Australia profile

Australian female artistic gymnasts
Living people
1990 births
21st-century Australian women